Gulab Devi Chest Hospital is a 1,500 bed semi-private tertiary care chest hospital located in Ferozepur Road, Lahore, Punjab, Pakistan.The hospital was established in 1934 by Indian freedom fighter Lala Lajpat Rai in the memory of his mother, Gulab Devi, who died due to tuberculosis in 1927.

The hospital is affiliated with Fatima Jinnah Medical College as a teaching hospital and is also affiliated with College of Physicians and Surgeons of Pakistan, as well as with Postgraduate Medical Institute (PGMI) and Ameer-ud-Din Medical College, both of which are affiliated with University of Health Sciences, Lahore.
It has its own Medical College on its premises; Al-Aleem Medical College.

History 

Lala Lajput Rai established a trust in 1927 to build and run a hospital, to perpetuate the memory of his mother; who died of tuberculosis in Lahore. The hospital is reportedly built where she breathed her last. The trust bought 40 acres of land and were granted 10 acres by the government in 1930. The construction of the hospital began in 1931 and was completed in 1934. It was opened on 17 July 1934 by Mahatma Gandhi.

In 1947, the hospital had 50 beds. Since it was located near the Railway Station that brought in refugees from India, those injured were brought here. Mohammad Ali Jinnah along with Fatima Jinnah visited the hospital on 6 November 1947 and wrote;“ I visited the Gulab Devi Hospital which is now tending to the refugees on 6th November, 1947. Those who are in charge of it viz Doctors, Nurses and other are doing excellent work and deserve our thanks for their selfless devotion to this humanitarian work".The Cardiac wing began in 1984 and the hospital is now one of the biggest cardio-thoracic hospitals in South and East Asia giving Tertiary health care to 1500 patients.

Chairman of the Managing Committee 
After the separation of the subcontinent in 1947, the government of Pakistan invited Begum Raana Liaquat Ali Khan, Syed Maratab Ali, Professor Dr.Amiruddin and some other notables and philanthropists to become acting Trustees of the Hospital in July 1948. They constituted a Managing Committee with Begum Raana in the chair, for running the Gulab Devi Chest Hospital.

In 1958, Syed Maratab Ali was unanimously elected as chairman of the Managing Committee of the hospital. On his demise in 1961, the mantle passed on to Syed Wajid Ali who was elected as chairman for life. Syed Wajid Ali elected Syed Shahid Ali and on his resignation, Mrs. Manzoor Ellahi was elected as chairperson of the Managing Committee unanimously in a meeting of the Managing Committee held on 15 June 2013. On the resignation of Mrs. Manzoor Ellahi, Syed Shahid Ali was elected as chairman of Managing Committee unanimously in a meeting of managing Committee held on 12 June 2014.

Departments 

 Out-Patients Department
 DOTS/DOTS PLUS
 In-Patients Department
 TB Wards
 Chest Surgical And Emergency Unit
 Anesthesia Department
 Chest ICU
 Oncology (Cancer) Ward
 Asthma Ward
 Asthma Clinic
 Bronchoscopy Unit
 Cardiac Complex
 Cardiac Surgery
 Pathology Department
 Radiology Department
 Computer Section
 Social Welfare Department
 Society for Rehabilitation of Patients
 Gulab Devi Post Graduate Medical Institute
 Library

References

Hospital buildings completed in 1934
Hospitals in Lahore
Memorials to Lala Lajpat Rai
1934 establishments in India
20th-century architecture in India